This is a list of medical drama television programs.

Africa

Egypt
 Critical Moments (Grey's Anatomy adaptation) (2007)

Kenya
 Saints (2011)

Americas

Argentina
 Los Medicos de hoy (2000)
Los Medicos de hoy 2 (2001)
Locas de Amor (2004)
Mujeres de Nadie (2007)
El paraíso (2011)
En terapia (2012)
Tiempos Compulsivos (2012)

Brazil
 Mulher (1998 - 1999)
 A Cura (2010)
 Sob Pressão (2017–Present)

Canada
 D4. Simon Locke (1971-1974)
 The Body in Question (1978-1979)
 Side Effects (1994-1996)
 Jozi-H (2006-2007)
 Bloodletting & Miraculous Cures (2010)
 Trauma (2010–Present)
 Combat Hospital (2011)
 Saving Hope (2012-2017)
 Hard Rock Medical (2013–2018)
 Emergency Room: Life + Death at VGH (2014-2017)
 Remedy (2014-2015)
 Keeping Canada Alive (2015-present)
 Mary Kills People (2017-2019)
 Coroner (2019-present)
 Nurses (2020–present)
 Transplant (2020–present)

Chile
 El milagro de vivir (1990).
 Urgencias (2005).
 Sin anestesia (2009).
 Vida por vida (2012).
 Pulseras Rojas: Chile (2014).

Colombia
 Mental (2009)
 A Corazón Abierto (Grey's Anatomy adaptation) (2010–2011)
 Mentiras perfectas (Nip/Tuck adaptation) (2013–2014)

Mexico
 A Corazón Abierto (Adaptation from colombian version of Grey's Anatomy, 2011-2012)
 Rafaela (2011)

Peru
 Clave Uno: Médicos en alerta (2009–2010)

United States

Asia

Bangladesh
Basto Dakter (2004)
Doctor Jamai (2013)
Poshu Doctor
Vondo Doctor (2014)
Abul Doctor (2014)
Bahadur Doctor

China
Angel Heart
OB-Gyns
Surgeons

Hong Kong
 Heartstrings (1994) 
 Healing Hands (1998)
 Healing Hands II (2000)
 Placebo Cure (2003)
 The White Flame (2004)
 The Last Breakthrough (2004)
 Healing Hands III (2005)
 The Hippocratic Crush (2012)
 A Great Way to Care I and II (2011, 2013)
 The Hippocratic Crush II (2013)
 Angel In-the-Making (2015)
 The Last Healer in Forbidden City (2016)
 Big White Duel (2019)
 Kids' Lives Matter (2021)

India
 Lifeline (1989)
 Sanjeevani (2002)
 Dhadkan (2004)
 Dill Mill Gayye (2007)
 Ekhane Aakash Neel (2008)
 Kuch Toh Log Kahenge (2011)
 Ayushmaan (2004)
 Zindagi Wins (2015)
 Ek Nayi Ummeed - Roshni (2015)
 Savitri Devi College & Hospital (2017-2018) 
 Anjali (2017)
 Shanthi Nilayam 2012-2013
 Uyirmei (2014-2015)
 Sanjeevani (2019)
 Ekhane Aakash Neel Season 2 (2019)
 Jigarbaaz (2020-2021)
 Dhadkan Zindaggi Kii (2021-)
 Human (2022-)

Indonesia
 Pelangi Harapan (2003-2004)

Israel
 BeTipul (2005–2008)
 Magen David Darom (2019–)

Japan
 Kyumei Byoutou 24-ji (1999, 2001, 2005, 2009)
 Shiroi Kyotō (2003)
 Dr. Coto's Clinic (2003-2006)
 Iryu: Team Medical Dragon (2006–07, 2010)
 Code Blue (2008, 2010)
 Team Batista no Eikō (2008)
 GodHand Teru (2009)
 Jin (2009-2011)
 General Rouge no Gaisen (2010)
 Saijou-no-Meii (2011)
 Doctor-X: Surgeon Michiko Daimon (2012-present)
 Clinic on the Sea (2013)
 Iryu: Team Medical Dragon (2014)
 A LIFE (2017)
 Koi wa Tsuzuku yo Doko Made mo  (2020) 
Doctor's Affairs
The Good Doctor (2018)
 Veterinarian Dolittle
 Sakanoue Animal Clinic Story

Malaysia
 Ampang Medikal
 Cinta Medik
 Medik TV

North Korea
 Our Warm House (2000)

Pakistan
 Dhoop Kinarey (PTV) (around the 1980s)
 Emergency Ward (PTV) (around the 1980s)
 Ambulance (Indus TV) (2005)
 Teray Pehlu May (Geo Ent) (2009–present)
 Yaqeen Ka Safar (Hum TV) (2017)
 Life Line (See TV) (2017)

Philippines
 Habang May Buhay (2010...ABS-CBN)
 Altapresyon (2012...TV5)
 Obsession (2014...TV5)
 Sa Puso ni Dok (2014...GMA Network)
 Abot-Kamay na Pangarap (2022–present...GMA Network)

Saudi Arabia
 37 dc (2009–2010)

Singapore
 First Touch
 Making Miracles
 A Child's Hope
 The Oath (TV series)
 Vallamai Tharayo (Tamil Language)

South Korea
 General Hospital (1995)
 Medical Brothers (1997)
 Sunflower (1998)
 Hur Jun (1999)
 Medical Center (2000)
 Dae Jang Geum (2003)
 Thank You (2007)
 White Tower (2007)
 New Heart (2007)
 Surgeon Bong Dal-hee (2007)
 Before and After: Plastic Surgery Clinic (2008)
 General Hospital 2 (2008)
 OB & GY (2010)
 Brain (2011)
 Syndrome (2012)
 Time Slip Dr. Jin (2012)
 Golden Time (2012)
 The 3rd Hospital (2012)
 Faith (2012 TV series) (2012)
 Horse Doctor (2012)
 Good Doctors (2013)
 Medical Top Team (2013)
 Emergency Couple (2014)
 Angel Eyes (2014)
 Doctor Stranger (2014)
 It's Okay, That's Love (2014)
 Kill Me, Heal Me (2015)
 Blood (2015)
 Yong-pal (2015)
 D-Day (2015)
 Descendants of the Sun (2016)
 The Doctors (2016)
 Beautiful Mind (2016)
 Dr. Romantic (2016)
 W (2016)
 Hospital Ship (2017)
 Live Up to Your Name, Dr. Heo (2017)
 Cross (2017-2018)
 A Poem a Day (2018)
 Investigation Couple (2018)
 Heart Surgeons (2018)
 Doctor Prisoner (2019)
 Doctor John (2019)
 Doctor Detective (2019)
 Dr. Romantic 2 (2020)
 Hospital Playlist (2020)
 Ghost Doctor(2022)

Taiwan
 The Hospital (2006)
 Will Being Love (2009)
 High Heels And A Scalpel (2014)
 Wake Up (TV series) (2015)
 Wake Up 2 (2017)
 The Coordinators (2019)
 Light Of Cloudy Day (2019)
 A Fool Like Me (2020)
 Luo Que (2020)

Thailand
 Thara Himalaya (2012...Channel 3)
 Khun Chai Puttipat (2013...Channel 3)

Europe

Russia
 Интерны (2014)
 дело врачей  (2013) NTV (Russia)
 кровинушка (2012) TV Russia-1
 Дневник доктора Зайцевой(2012) CTC Media
 Личные обстоятельства  (2012) Channel One Russia
 Военный госпиталь (2012) TV Russia-1
 Женский доктор (2012) Кинокомпания FILM.UA
 Страна 03 (2012)
 Склифосовский (2012) кинокомпания «русское»
 Лист ожидания (2012) Кинокомпания FILM.UA
 Верное средство (2012) REN TV
 Самара (2012) СТБ
 Сердце Марии (2011)
 Попытка Веры (2010) Channel One Russia
 Земский доктор (2010) TV Russia-1
 Судмедэксперты (2010) Всемирные русские студии
 Практика (2016) Channel One Russia
 Лучшие врачи (2015) NTV (Russia)
 Дежурный ангел (2013) ТВ-3
 Тест на беременность (2015) Channel One Russia
 Врач (2010)
 Доктор Тырса (2010) Epic Media
 Общая терапия (2008) Channel One Russia
 Я лечу (2008) STS (TV channel)
 Знахарь (2008) NTV (Russia)
 Служба доверия (2007)
 Личная жизнь доктора Селивановой (2007)

Croatia
 Hitna 94 / Emergency 94 (2010)

Czech Republic
 Nemocnice na kraji města (1977–1981)
 Sanitka (1984-1985)
 Nemocnice na kraji města po dvaceti letech (2003)
 Ordinace v růžové zahradě (2005–present)
 Nemocnice na kraji města - nové osudy (2008)
 Zázraky života (2010)
 Sanitka 2 (2013)
 Doktor Martin (2015–2018)
 Doktoři z Počátků (2013–2016)
 Modrý Kód (2017–2020)
 Sestřičky (2020–present)

Denmark
 The Kingdom (1994–1997)
 SYGEPLEJESKOLEN (The New Nurses) [2018]

Bulgaria
 Stolen Life (TV series) (2016–present)

Finland
 Ihmeidentekijät (1996–1998)
 Parhaat vuodet (2000, 2002)
 Syke (2014–)
 Ihon alla (2016)

France
 Médecins de nuit (1978–1986)
 Janique Aimée
 Petit docteur
 Les pédiatres
 Équipe médicale d'urgence

Georgia/Sakartvelo 
 Suburban Girl MedER (2010–2012)
 Clinical Death (2014)
 Artificial Breathing (2016–present)

Germany/Austria
 Die Schwarzwaldklinik (1985–1989)
 Der Landarzt (1986–2012)
 Praxis Bülowbogen (1987–1996)
 Der Bergdoktor (1992–1997)
 Hallo, Onkel Doc! (1994–2000)
 Dr. Stefan Frank – Der Arzt, dem die Frauen vertrauen (1995–2001)
 Für alle Fälle Stefanie (1995–2005)
 Alphateam – Die Lebensretter im OP (1996–2005)
 Die Rettungsflieger (1997–2007)
 St. Angela (1997–2004)
 Dr. Sommerfeld – Neues vom Bülowbogen (1997–2004)
 Medicopter 117 – Jedes Leben zählt (1997–2002)
 In aller Freundschaft (1998–present)
 Familie Dr. Kleist (2004–present)
 Doctor's Diary (2007–2010)
 Doktor Martin (2007–2009)
 Der Bergdoktor (2008–present)
 Add a Friend (2012–2014)
Charité at War (2019)

Greece
 Iatriko Aporrito (2009–2010)
 Kliniki Periptosi

Italy
 La dottoressa Giò (1997–1998, 2019)
 Un medico in famiglia (1998–2016)
 Una donna per amico (1998-2001)
 Incantesimo (1998-2008)
 In Treatment (2013-2017)
 Medicina generale (2007-2010)
 Nati ieri (2006-2007)
 Chirurgia d’urgenza (2008)
 Crimini Bianchi (2008-2009)
 Medici Miei (2008)
 Terapia d'urgenza (2009)
 Braccialetti Rossi (2014-2016)
L'allieva (2016–2020)
Doc - Nelle tue mani (2020–present)
Fino all'ultimo battito (2021)

The Netherlands/Belgium
 Memorandum van een dokter (1963–1965)
 Medisch Centrum West (1988–1994)
 Spoed (2000–2008)
 Trauma 24/7 (2002–2003)
 IC (2002–2006)
 De co-assistent (2007–2010)
 Dokter Deen (2012–present)
 Dokter Tinus (2012)

Norway

 Valkyrien (2017–present)

Poland

 Doktor Ewa (1971)
 Układ krążenia (1977–1978)
 Na dobre i na złe (1999–present)
 Szpital na perypetiach (2001–2003)
 Daleko od noszy (2003–2010)
 Lekarze (2012–2014)
 Szpital (2013–2020)
 Na Sygnale (2014–present)
 Pielęgniarki (2014–2016)
 Diagnoza (2017–2019)
 Lekarze na start (2017)

Portugal
 Maternidade (2011–2013)
 Médico de Família (1998–2000)
 Sinais de Vida (2013–2014)

Republic of Ireland
 The Clinic (2003–2009)
 Whistleblower (2008)

Serbia
 "Urgentni centar" (2014)

Slovakia
 Nemocnice na kraji města (1977–1981)
 Ordinácia v ružovej záhrade (2007)
 Dr. Ludsky (2011)
 Dr. Dokonalý (2012-2013)
 Doktori (2014)
 Doktor Martin (2015–2018)
 Sestričky (2018–present)

Spain
 Doctor Mateo (2009-2011)
 Hospital Central (2000–present)
 Médico de familia (1995-199?)
"Centro Médico" (2015–present)
Pulseras Rojas (2012-2013)

Sweden
 Unga läkare (2012)
 Syrror (2016)

Turkey
 Doktorlar (2006-2011)
 Merhaba Hayat (2012-2013)
 Acil Servis (2014)
 Acil Aşk Aranıyor (2014-2015)
 112 Acil (2017)
 Kalp Atışı (2017-2018)
 Mucize Doktor (2019-2021)
 Hekimoğlu (2019-2021)

United Kingdom
 Emergency Ward 10 (1957–1967)
 Police Surgeon (1960)
 Dr. Finlay's Casebook (1962–1971)
 The Doctors (1969–1971)
 General Hospital (1972–1979)
 Angels (1975–1983)
 The District Nurse (1984–1987)
 A Very Peculiar Practice (1986–1992)
 Casualty (1986–present)
 Children's Ward (1989–2000)
 Medics (1990–1995)
 Doctor Finlay (1993–1996)
 Peak Practice (1993–2002)
 Cardiac Arrest (1994–1996)
 Bramwell (1995–1999)
 Silent Witness (1996–present)
 Holby City (1999–2022)
 Always and Everyone (1999–2002)
 Doctors (2000–present)
 The Royal (2003–2011)
 Casualty@Holby City (2004–2005)
 Bodies (2004–2006)
 No Angels (2004–2006)
 Doc Martin (2004–present)
 Green Wing (2004–2007)
 The Royal Today (2008)
 Crash (2009–2010)
 Getting On (2009–2012)
 The Indian Doctor (2010–2013)
 Sirens (2011)
 Monroe (2011–2012)
 Call the Midwife (2012–present)
 Critical (2015)
 Doctor Foster (2015–present)
 Trust Me (2017)
 Trauma (2018–present)
 This Is Going To Hurt (2022)

Oceania

Australia/New Zealand
 Emergency (1959)
 The Young Doctors (1976–1983)
 A Country Practice (1981–1994)
 The Flying Doctors (1985–1991)
 G.P. (1989–1996)
 Children's Hospital (1997-1998)
 Shortland Street (1992–present)
 Medivac (1996–1998)
 All Saints (1998–2009)
 MDA (2002–2003, 2005)
 The Surgeon (2005)
 Offspring (2010–2017)
 Reef Doctors(2013)
 Doctor Doctor (2016-2021)

References

Medical drama
Medical television series